Tipton High School may refer to one of several high schools in the United States:

Tipton High School (Indiana) in Tipton, Indiana
Tipton Community School District in Tipton, Iowa
Tipton High School (Kansas) in Tipton, Kansas
Tipton High School (Missouri) in Tipton, Missouri
Tipton High School (Oklahoma) in Tipton, Oklahoma